Wendy Trott (born 14 February 1990) is a South African swimmer. She competed at the 2008 Summer Olympics in the Women's 400 and Women's 800 metre freestyle, finishing 9th in the latter and the 2012 Summer Olympics in the Women's 400 and Women's 800 metre freestyle, finishing 12th in the latter.

She is currently working at a global philanthropic organizations Luminate Group.

See also

 List of University of Georgia people
 List of Commonwealth Games medallists in swimming (women)

References

1990 births
Living people
Georgia Bulldogs women's swimmers
Olympic swimmers of South Africa
South African female freestyle swimmers
Swimmers at the 2008 Summer Olympics
Swimmers at the 2012 Summer Olympics
Commonwealth Games medallists in swimming
Commonwealth Games silver medallists for South Africa
Swimmers at the 2010 Commonwealth Games
20th-century South African women
21st-century South African women
Medallists at the 2010 Commonwealth Games